The Omaha Flame were a proposed independent professional baseball team based in Omaha, Nebraska.  They were to have joined the North American League as an expansion team in 2011 and are expected to join the league's Eastern Division.  They were to have played their home games at TD Ameritrade Park in Omaha (new home of the NCAA Division I College World Series) as early as 2011.  The ballpark was also to have played host to the newly formatted NABL Championship Series, but that never materialized

They were to have replaced the Joliet JackHammers, who joined the Frontier League and became the Joliet Slammers.  The Flame were to be the second team to have played professional baseball in the Omaha area.  The Omaha Storm Chasers currently play in the Triple-A Pacific Coast League, but play at their new ballpark, Werner Park in Papillion, Nebraska.  They never took the field as the NABL folded in 2010.

References

External links
 Omaha Flame official website

Baseball in Omaha, Nebraska
Independent league baseball teams
Baseball teams established in 2011
2011 establishments in Nebraska